Alpine Airstrip  is a private-use airport located 53 nautical miles (98 km) west of the central business district of Deadhorse, in Alpine, North Slope Borough in the U.S. state of Alaska. It is privately owned by ConocoPhillips Alaska, Inc.

As per Federal Aviation Administration records, this airport had 786 passenger boardings (enplanements) in calendar year 2007, an increase of 1915% from the 39 enplanements in 2006.

Facilities 
Alpine Airstrip Airport has one runway (3/21) with a gravel surface measuring 5,000 by 100 feet (1,524 x 30 m).

References

External links 
 

Airports in North Slope Borough, Alaska